Madkaikar is a surname. Notable people with the surname include:

Pandurang Madkaikar (born 1964), Indian politician
Parag Madkaikar (born 1986), Indian cricketer
Shamrao Madkaikar (1910–2011), Indian activist

Surnames of Indian origin